Brenneis is a German language occupational surname for a blacksmith and may refer to:
Don Brenneis (born 1946), American anthropologist
Gerd Brenneis (1930–2003), German operatic tenor
Jo Brenneis (1910–1994), German painter
Otto Brenneis (1900–1945), German SS-Hauptsturmführer

See also 
 Brenizer, Pennsylvania
 Brenizer Method

References 

German-language surnames
Occupational surnames